Nicolás Pedro Lugli (born 9 July 1996) is an Argentine professional footballer who plays as a forward for Ituzaingó.

Career
Before Lugli joined CA Platense, the forward had stints with Deportivo Villa de Mayo and Unión Florida. He made two sub appearances for Platense in 2015, prior to appearing as a starter for the first time in October 2016 during a 1–1 draw away to Acassuso. After twenty appearances across four campaigns with Platense, the last concluding with promotion to Primera B Nacional, Lugli left on loan in August 2018 to Primera B Metropolitana's Deportivo Español. He was sent off on his first start in a September fixture with Deportivo Riestra, which was one of seventeen appearances for the club as they were relegated.

July 2019 saw Lugli make a loan return to tier three with San Miguel. He scored his first senior goal on 15 September away to Defensores Unidos, prior to his departure mid-season. In January 2020, Lugli permanently switched Argentina's CA Platense for their Honduras namesakes Platense FC. He remained for half of 2019–20 and half of 2020–21, featuring nineteen times in Liga Nacional whilst scoring twice; against Marathón and Honduras Progreso respectively. In early 2021, Lugli returned to his homeland with Primera C Metropolitana's Ituzaingó. He netted on his unofficial debut on 24 February versus Cañuelas.

Career statistics
.

Honours
Platense
Primera B Metropolitana: 2017–18

References

External links

1996 births
Living people
Sportspeople from Buenos Aires Province
Argentine footballers
Association football forwards
Argentine expatriate footballers
Expatriate footballers in Honduras
Argentine expatriate sportspeople in Honduras
Primera B Metropolitana players
Liga Nacional de Fútbol Profesional de Honduras players
Club Atlético Platense footballers
Deportivo Español footballers
Club Atlético San Miguel footballers
Platense F.C. players
Club Atlético Ituzaingó players